GRAM domain-containing 2B protein (GRAMD2B; formerly GRAMD3), also known as NS3TP2 and HCV NS3-transactivated protein 2 is a protein encoded by the GRAMD2B gene.

GRAMD2B has four paralogs: GRAMD1A, GRAMD1B, GRAMD1C and GRAMD2A.  These proteins are mammalian representatives of the yeast lipid transfer proteins anchored at a membrane contact site (LAM) family.

GRAMD2B consists of a GRAM domain and a transmembrane domain anchoring it to the endoplasmic reticulum. Similar to GRAMD2A, GRAMD2B lacks the VASt domain found in LAM and GRAMD1 proteins. Its function has not yet been defined, but is likely similar to that of GRAMD2A.

References